Steve Lehman may refer to:

 Steve Lehman (composer) (born 1978), jazz composer and saxophonist
 Steve Lehman (photographer), American-born photographer